The Harvard Book Award or Harvard Prize Book is an award given out by the alumni of Harvard University to the top-performing student(s) in 11th/12th grade reading classes in nearly 2,000 "selected" high schools from around the world. The award has been in existence since 1910.

The award is traditionally handed out at graduation ceremonies. Criteria for selection vary by school, and it is usually associated with unmistakable academic excellence, strength of character and achievements in other fields.

Each Book awarded comes with an official Harvard bookplate which states the name of the donor and the award recipient and a commemorative bookmark.

The Harvard Prize Books are usually presented at the end of the academic year at high school award ceremonies or high school graduations.

References

Harvard Prize Book is an achievement award from the Harvard Alumni Association awarded to the outstanding high school student in the next-to-graduating class (junior year) who "displays excellence in scholarship and high character, combined with achievements in other fields."

State level Harvard Clubs provide the awards to approximately 2,000 selected high schools around the world. The Minnesota Harvard Alumni group states "We fellow Minnesotans participate in the Harvard alumni Association's Prize book program because we honor Minnesota Students, and the educators and institutions who encourage of student to respect ideas and their free expression, and to rejoice in discovery and in critical thought; to pursue excellence in a spirit of productive cooperation; and to assume responsibility for the consequences of personal actions."

References

See also
Graduation
Harvard University

Harvard University